Chryseobacterium arthrosphaerae  is a Gram-negative and rod-shaped bacteria from the genus of Chryseobacterium which has been isolated from the faeces of the pill millipede Arthrosphaera magna in India.

References

Further reading

External links
Type strain of Chryseobacterium arthrosphaerae at BacDive -  the Bacterial Diversity Metadatabase

arthrosphaerae
Bacteria described in 2010